Edward Webster Bemis (7 April 1860 Springfield, Massachusetts – 25 September 1930) was an American economist and a public utility expert.  He was a proponent of municipal ownership.

Biography
He graduated from Amherst College in 1880, and received a degree of PhD in 1885 at Johns Hopkins University after over three years' advanced work in economics and history. In 1887 he suggested the use of literacy test as a device to restrict the total number of immigrants coming into the United States. He was a pioneer lecturer in the university extension system, 1887–88; professor of economics and history, Vanderbilt University, 1889–1892; and associate professor of economics, University of Chicago, 1892-1895. At the latter institution, he was obligated to leave because of his  “radical” viewpoint. He was assistant statistician to the Illinois bureau of labour statistics in 1896, and in 1897 he was professor of economics and history in the Kansas State Agricultural College.

He was superintendent of the city water department of Cleveland, Ohio, 1901–1909; deputy commissioner of water supply, gas and electricity of New York City, 1910; consulting expert for cities and states on public utilities after 1910. He became a member of the advisory board, valuation division, Interstate Commerce Commission; city representative on board of supervising engineers, Chicago Traction; and director of valuations of public utilities for the District of Columbia, the city of Dallas, Texas, and other places.

Works

 History of Co-operation in the United States (1888)
 Municipal Ownership of Gas in the U.S. (1891)
 Municipal Monopolies (1899)

He did many scientific studies of co-operation, trades unions, immigration, etc., but after 1900 chiefly confined his writing to technical reports for various public bodies.

Family
He married Annie L. Sargent on 28 October 1889, and they had three children.

Footnotes

Further reading

 Harold E. Bergquist, Jr., "The Edward W. Bemis Controversy at the University of Chicago," AAUP Bulletin, vol. 58, no. 4 (Dec. 1972), pp. 384–393. In JSTOR
 Richard Hofstadter and Walter Metzger, The Development of Academic Freedom in the United States. New York: Columbia University Press, 1955.
 Richard Storr, Harper's University: The Beginnings. Chicago: The University of Chicago Press, 1966.

References

External links
 

1860 births
1930 deaths
American Christian socialists
American economists
Amherst College alumni
Johns Hopkins University alumni
Vanderbilt University faculty
University of Chicago faculty